John Pizzarelli Salutes Johnny Mercer: Live at Birdland is a tribute album by John Pizzarelli to American songwriter Johnny Mercer. It was recorded live at the Birdland jazz club in New York in 2014, and released in 2015 by his Vector Records label. The album was recorded as a medley, interspersed with commentary by Pizzarelli.

Background 
Pizzarelli had performed Johnny Mercer tunes on previous albums, and as a cast member of the 1997 Broadway musical Dream.  Pizzarelli explained the album dedicated to Mercer was significant given Mercer was "responsible for so many great things in [his] life."

Reception 
Christopher Loudon wrote in JazzTimes, "Pizzarelli manages to squeeze a remarkably panoptic homage into 65 minutes, covering 26 Mercer tunes, familiar and obscure, from all stages of his career...[Pizzarelli] remains the Dorian Gray of jazz, his sound and sensibility preternaturally boyish, joyously championing an art he was, quite literally, born into."

For Vintage Guitar magazine, Rich Kienzle wrote, "[o]n 'I Got Out of Bed on the Right Side' and 'Goody Goody' Pizzarelli offers the usual Bensonesque scat-guitar solos. 'Dearly Beloved' features a crisp, single-string break. He comps as flawlessly as his dad, Bucky, on 'Accentuate the Positive', 'Skylark', and 'Too Marvelous for Words'...Lesser-known gems like the swing-era 'Jamboree Jones' and 'Slue Foot' also get their due. While 'Something's Gotta Give' features driving single-string work, his solo on 'Emily' is a model of brevity and eloquence."

Track listing

Personnel

Musicians 
 John Pizzarelli – guitar, vocals
 Budd Burridge – baritone saxophone, clarinet, bass clarinet
 Ken Hitchcock – alto saxophone, tenor saxophone, clarinet, flute
 John Mosca – trombone
 Konrad Paszkudzki – piano
 Martin Pizzarelli – bass
 Kevin Kanner – drums

Support 
 Chris Byars – arrangement ("You Medly")
 Dick Lieb – arrangement ("Jamboree Jones")
 Don Sebesky – arrangement (all other tracks)

References

External links 
 

2015 live albums
John Pizzarelli albums
Johnny Mercer tribute albums